Romny is a city in Sumy Oblast, northern Ukraine. It is located on the Romen River. Romny serves as the administrative centre of Romny Raion and hosts the administration of Romny urban hromada, one of the hromadas of Ukraine. Population:

History

The city was founded in AD 902. On September 16, 2002 the city celebrated its 1,100th anniversary.
Romny was first mentioned in documents in 1096 (as Romen, ; the name, originally that of the river, is of Baltic origin, cf. Lithuanian romus 'quiet'). At various times, it passed under Mongol, Lithuanian, Polish and Russian rule. By 1638, the city had a population of 6,000 inhabitants, which made it by far the largest settlement in the area. In 1781, the city was granted a charter by the Tsarina Catherine II.

In Romny the first statue of Taras Shevchenko was erected on 27 October 1918 when the city was located in the newly established Ukrainian state, but it was preserved as part of the Soviet Union Ukrainization-policy's. The concrete statue in Romny began to decay in the 1950s, but was remade in bronze and re-unveiled in 1982. The original version of the monument is located on Kyiv's Andriyivskyy Descent.

During World War II, Romny was occupied by the German Army from September 10, 1941 to September 16, 1943. The Germans operated a Nazi prison in the city.

In the period between 1979 and 1989, Romny's population rose from 53,016 to 57,502 inhabitants.

In 2022, a series of military engagements occurred near Romny during the 2022 Russian invasion of Ukraine.

Climate

Sights

The cathedral of the Holy Spirit, founded in 1735 in place of a wooden church, is a four-pillared cathedral designed in the Ukrainian Baroque style and is surmounted by three pear-shaped domes, each placed on a tall cylinder. Although the cathedral dates back to the 1740s, the building of the nearby belfry and winter church was not undertaken until 1780.

Another noteworthy building is the church of the Ascension, which also has three domes, but was constructed later, in 1795–1801, and adjoins a Baroque belfry built in 1753–63.

Local government
Beside the city itself, the city municipality also serves as government for a village Kolisnykove and a settlement Luchky.

The city also has administration of the surrounding Romny Raion.

Gallery

Notable people
 Yevhen Adamtsevych (1904-1972), prominent blind Ukrainian bandurist
 Haim Arlosoroff (1899–1933), notable Socialist Zionist leader
 Maksym Biletskyi (born 1980), Ukrainian footballer
 Larisa Netšeporuk (born 1970), heptathlete who represented Ukraine and Estonia
 Pinhas Rutenberg (1879–1942), Russian socialist revolutionary and Zionist leader in Palestine, prominent engineer and businessman
 Isaac Schwartz (1923–2009), Soviet composer
 Grigory Sokolnikov (born Hirsch Brilliant; 1888–1939), Bolshevik revolutionary and Soviet politician
 Joachim Stutschewsky (1891–1982), Ukraine-born Austrian and Israeli cellist, composer, and musicologist
 Abram Ioffe (1880–1960), prominent Russian/Soviet physicist
 Several of the founding members (1909-10) of Degania, the first kibbutz settlement in Palestine

References

External links
Unofficial information Site Romny; 
Site Romen; 

Cities in Sumy Oblast
Romensky Uyezd
Kiev Voivodeship
Shtetls
Cities of regional significance in Ukraine
Populated places established in the 10th century